Djédaa is a town in the Batha Region of central Chad.

Transport
The town is served by Djédaa Airport.

References

Populated places in Chad
Batha Region